Robert Stitchill (sometimes Robert Stichel; died 1274) was a medieval Bishop of Durham in England.

Life

Stitchill probably came from the village of Stichill in Roxburghshire. His father was a priest, and may have been the William Scot who was elected to the see of Durham in 1226. William Scot was never confirmed as bishop, for his election was quashed by Pope Gregory IX in 1227. Stitchill was a monk at Durham Cathedral and prior of a monastic cell at Finchale before he was elected to the see of Durham on 30 September 1260. His dispensation for his illegitimate birth had already been obtained from the pope. He was consecrated bishop on 13 February 1261 at Southwell by Godfrey Ludham, the Archbishop of York.

While bishop, Stitchill gave  of land to the monks of his cathedral chapter for their support, as well as books and other gifts. However, there were disputes with the monks over the retirement of their prior, and also over the right of the bishop to oversee the affairs of the chapter. He also founded a hospital at Greatham, County Durham that survived into the modern age. He defended the rights of the bishop to the palatinate of Durham, securing a number of court decisions that upheld the palatinate rights of the bishop.

Stitchill attended the Second Council of Lyon in 1274, where he obtained the permission of Pope Gregory X to resign his see. He died on 4 August 1274 near Lyons, before he was able to return to Durham to resign. He was buried at Savigny Abbey, although his heart was sent to Durham to be buried there.

Citations

References

 
 
 

Bishops of Durham
1274 deaths
13th-century English Roman Catholic bishops
Year of birth unknown